is a Japanese actress, singer, and model. She is often referred to as the “original” kyonyu (huge breasts) idol.

Life and career
Hosokawa was born in Mutsu, Aomori Prefecture and lived in Etajima, Hiroshima Prefecture until the age of four. She then moved to Hawaii for a year to attend school there. She is the daughter of a rear admiral in the Japan Maritime Self-Defense Force.

She started posing for magazines in December 1990 as a bikini model. Soon afterwards she also started singing and acting in films.

She is 163 cm (5'4") tall. Her official website charts her changing figure over time. In 1990 she was 94-60-90 cm (37-24-35 inches). In 2006 she was 90-59-87 cm (35-23-34 inches). After a lengthy hiatus from bikini modelling, she released two gravure idol DVDs in 2006.

On 20 December 2007 she gave birth to her first child, a boy, with husband Hisato Endo, and announced her withdrawal from celebrity life. However, before giving birth, she had posed for her first-ever nude photo book, 'Fumming', which was released in August 2007.

However in December 2009, a Japanese sports newspaper reported that she and Endo were divorced.

She made a comeback to celebrity life in March 2014, after she appearing at Sunday Japon on TBS.

Partial filmography
 SHIN PRODUCE Fumie Hosokawa Mitsumete (gravure) (2006)
 Sei (gravure)(2006)
 Paato-taimu tantei 2 (TV) (2004)
 Idol Ougon Densetsu: (Idol Golden Legend) (gravure) (2004)
 Shôwa kayô daizenshû (2003)
 Sennen no koi - Hikaru Genji monogatari(2001)
 Kikujirô no natsu (1999)
 Hana no oedo no Tsuribaka Nisshi (1998)
 Tsuribaka Nisshi 10 (1998)
 Gokudo no onna-tachi: Kejime (1998)
 Tsuribaka nisshi 9 (1997)
 Purupuru Tenshi Kyoshitsu (1993)

References

Sources
 
 細川ふみえ (Hosokawa Fumie) Filmography at jmdb.ne.jp (in Japanese)
 細川ふみえ (Hosokawa Fumie) Profile at Web I-dic (in Japanese)

External links
 

1971 births
People from Mutsu, Aomori
People from Etajima, Hiroshima
Actors from Aomori Prefecture
Japanese actresses
Japanese gravure idols
Living people
Models from Aomori Prefecture
Musicians from Aomori Prefecture